Plane Crazy is a 1928 American animated short film directed by Walt Disney and Ub Iwerks. The cartoon, released by the Walt Disney Studios, was the first Mickey Mouse film produced, and was originally a silent film. It was given a test screening to a theater audience on May 15, 1928, and an executive from Metro-Goldwyn-Mayer saw the film, but failed to pick up a distributor. Later that year, Disney released Mickey's first sound cartoon, Steamboat Willie, which was an enormous success. Apart from that, Plane Crazy was released again as a sound cartoon on March 17, 1929. It was the fourth Mickey film to be given a wide release after Steamboat Willie, The Gallopin' Gaucho, and The Barn Dance (1929).

Plot 
Mickey is trying to fly an airplane to imitate Charles Lindbergh. After building his own airplane, he does a flight simulation to ensure that the plane is safe for flight, but the flight fails, destroying the plane. Using a roadster and remains of his plane to create another plane, he asks a young mouse girl, Minnie, to join him for its first flight after she presents him with a horseshoe for good luck. They take an out-of-control flight with exaggerated, impossible situations. Clarabelle Cow briefly "rides" the aircraft. Mickey uses a turkey's tail as a tail for his plane. Once he regains control of the plane, he repeatedly tries to kiss Minnie. When she refuses, he uses force: he breaks her concentration and terrifies her by throwing her out of the airplane, catching her with the airplane, and he uses this to kiss her. Minnie responds by slapping Mickey and parachutes out of the plane using her bloomers. While distracted by her, Mickey loses control of the plane and eventually crashes into a tree. Minnie then lands, and Mickey laughs at her exposed bloomers. Minnie then storms off, rebuffing him. Mickey then angrily throws the good luck horseshoe given to him by Minnie, and it boomerangs around a tree, hitting him, ringing around his neck, and knocking him out; this causes stars to fly out toward the screen, with one of the stars filling the screen up, ending the film.

Production 
The short was co-directed by Walt Disney and Ub Iwerks. Iwerks was also the sole animator for this short and spent just two weeks working on it in a back room, at a rate of over 700 drawings a day. It is also speculated Hugh Harman and Rudolf Ising might have done work for the short as well. The sound version contained a soundtrack by Carl W. Stalling, who recorded it on October 26, 1928, when he was hired, and a month before Steamboat Willie was released.

This was the first animated film to use a camera move. The point of view shot from the plane made it appear as if the camera was tracking into the ground. In fact, when they shot this scene, they piled books under the spinning background to move the artwork closer to the camera.

Reception 
The Film Daily (March 24, 1929): "Clever. Mickey Mouse does his animal antics in the latest mode via areoplane. [sic] The cartoonist has employed his usual ingenuity to extract a volume of laughs that are by no means confined to the juveniles. The sound effects are particularly appropriate on this type of film, and certainly add greatly to the comedy angle with the absurd squeaks, yawps and goofy noises."

Variety (April 3, 1929): "Walt Disney sound cartoon, produced by Powers Cinephone, one of the Mickey Mouse series of animated cartoons. It's a snappy six minutes, with plenty of nonsensical action and a fitting musical accompaniment. Constitutes an amusingly silly interlude for any wired house. Disney has derived some breezy situations, one or two of them a bit saucy but, considering the animal characters, permissible."

Home media 
The short was released on December 2, 2002 on Walt Disney Treasures: Mickey Mouse in Black and White and on December 11, 2007 on Walt Disney Treasures: The Adventures of Oswald the Lucky Rabbit.

Copyright and preservation status 
The silent version was copyrighted on May 26, 1928, eleven days after it was test screened. The copyright for the silent version was renewed on March 14, 1956. To this day, the silent version that premiered at the test screening has not been found by Disney. The sound version, however, is available. It was copyrighted on August 9, 1930 and was renewed on December 16, 1957, however, the copyright of the film says 1929 (MCMXXIX).

The film will go in the public domain in 2025 in the United States according to current U.S. copyright law.

Legacy 
 In 1930, the story of Plane Crazy was adapted and used for the first story in the Mickey Mouse comic strip. This adaptation, entitled "Lost on a Desert Island," was written by Walt Disney with art by Ub Iwerks and Win Smith.
 In the Mickey Mouse short The Nifty Nineties (1941), Mickey and Minnie's car runs out of control and runs into a cow. The scene was taken almost directly from Plane Crazy.
 The cartoon Mickey's Airplane Kit (1999) from the series Mickey Mouse Works and House of Mouse featured a similar premise in which Mickey built his own airplane to impress Minnie.
 In the feature film Walt Before Mickey, Plane Crazy was featured.
 Plane Crazy plays in a continuous loop in the Main Street Cinema at Disneyland, albeit silently, next to Steamboat Willie.

See also 
 Mickey Mouse film series

References

External links 
  (official posted by Walt Disney Animation Studios)
 
 
 
 Plane Crazy at The Encyclopedia of Disney Animated Shorts

1929 animated films
1928 comedy films
1928 films
American aviation films
American black-and-white films
American silent short films
Animated films about aviation
Animated films without speech
1920s Disney animated short films
Films directed by Ub Iwerks
Films directed by Walt Disney
Films produced by Walt Disney
Films scored by Carl Stalling
Films set on airplanes
Mickey Mouse short films
1929 comedy films
1929 films
1920s American films